The Revolutionary Workers League was a Canadian Trostkyist party formed on 8 August 1977 by the fusion of the Revolutionary Marxist Group and its Quebec counterpart, the Groupe Marxiste Revolutionnaire, with the  League for Socialist Action. The organization marked the reunification of the Canadian section of the Fourth International and had a membership of several hundred people. The group published a monthly newspaper in English, Socialist Voice, as well as a French-language publication, La Lutte Ouvrière.

The RWL was heavily influenced by the Socialist Workers Party of the United States. When the SWP moved away from Trotskyism in the early 1980s, a faction fight broke out in the RWL between supporters of the SWP and supporters of a Trotskyist position over the issue of Leon Trotsky's theory of permanent revolution and the nature of the Cuban Revolution. While the Trotskyists argued that Cuba was a deformed workers' state, the supporters of the SWP argued that Cuban Revolution was a full workers' revolution and that the Cuban state was a genuine workers' state. The Trotskyists were expelled beginning in the early 1980s and formed what became Gauche Socialiste in Quebec and Socialist Challenge in English Canada. In the late 1980s the RWL left the Fourth International and in 1990 it changed its name to the Communist League.

See also
 Revolutionary Workers League (in Manitoba)

References

External links
 Canada Socialist History Project documents on Revolutionary Workers League, 1977-1988

1977 establishments in Canada
Political parties established in 1977
Trotskyist organizations in Canada